Football Sports Club Bukovyna Chernivtsi is a Ukrainian professional football club based in Chernivtsi.

History
The club was established in 1958 as Avanhard Chernivtsi (Avangard Chernovtsy) for republican competitions and became the first club from Chernivtsi Oblast to be added to the Soviet Class B competition in 1960. Before 1958 Chernivtsi were presented several times by various teams in republican competitions like Burevisnyk (1956), Dynamo (1948, 1950–1955), Spartak (1946, 1947, 1949), Lokomotyv (1949).

From 1992–94, Bukovyna played in the Ukrainian Premier League, after being initially chosen to participate for being one of the Ukrainian teams taking part in the Soviet First League in 1991.

Bukovyna Chernivtsi's best achievement in the Ukrainian Premier League was 10th place in its first season. The club was founded in 1958 under the name Avanguard.

Colours are yellow shirts, black shorts. Alternate colors are white and or red and black.

Team names

{|class="wikitable"
|- style="background:#efefef;"
|Year
|Name
|-
|1952–1958
|Burevisnyk
|-
|1958–1964
|Avanhard
|-
|1965–current
|Bukovyna
|}

Current squad
As of 4 March 2023

Honors
Soviet Vtoraya Liga (Group West)
Winners (1): 1990

Ukrainian Persha Liha
Runners Up (1): 1995–96

Ukrainian Druha Liha (Group A)
Winners (2): 1999–00, 2009–10

Chernivtsi Oblast championship
Winners (6): 1959, 1960, 1961, 1965, 1966, 1976

Bukovyna also holds an all-time record of the most points earned in the Soviet Second League.

League and cup history

Soviet Union
{|class="wikitable"
|- style="background:#efefef;"
! Season
! Div.
! Pos.
! Pl.
! W
! D
! L
! GS
! GA
! P
!Domestic Cup
!colspan=2|Others
!Notes
|-
|align=center colspan=14|Burevisnyk Chernivtsi
|-
|align=center|1956
|align=center|3rd "Group 7"
|align=center|6
|align=center|14
|align=center|5
|align=center|2
|align=center|7
|align=center|18
|align=center|22
|align=center|12
|align=center|
|align=center|
|align=center|
|align=center|
|-
|align=center|1957
|align=center colspan=13|
|-
|align=center colspan=14|Avangard Chernovtsy / Avanhard Chernivtsi
|-
|align=center|1958
|align=center|3rd "Group 5"
|align=center|2
|align=center|14
|align=center|9
|align=center|4
|align=center|1
|align=center|37
|align=center|9
|align=center|22
|align=center|
|align=center|UC
|align=center| finals
|align=center|
|-
|align=center|1959
|align=center|3rd "Group 9"
|align=center|3
|align=center|14
|align=center|9
|align=center|1
|align=center|4
|align=center|27
|align=center|20
|align=center|19
|align=center|
|align=center|
|align=center|
|align=center bgcolor=lightgreen|Promoted
|-
|align=center|1960
|align=center|2nd "Group 1"
|align=center|8
|align=center|32
|align=center|14
|align=center|9
|align=center|9
|align=center|47
|align=center|41
|align=center|37
|align=center|
|align=center|
|align=center|
|align=center|
|-
|align=center|1961
|align=center|2nd "Group 1"
|align=center|9
|align=center|34
|align=center|11
|align=center|10
|align=center|13
|align=center|50
|align=center|53
|align=center|32
|align=center|
|align=center|
|align=center|
|align=center|lost the 17th place game
|-
|align=center rowspan=2|1962
|align=center|2nd "Group 2"
|align=center|10
|align=center|24
|align=center|6
|align=center|6
|align=center|12
|align=center|27
|align=center|45
|align=center|18
|align=center|
|align=center|
|align=center|
|align=center|
|-
|align=center|Finals
|align=center|29 (1)
|align=center|10
|align=center|6
|align=center|2
|align=center|2
|align=center|15
|align=center|6
|align=center|14
|align=center|
|align=center|
|align=center|
|align=center bgcolor=pink|the 29th place tournament
|-
|align=center|1963
|align=center|3rd "Group 1"
|align=center|15
|align=center|38
|align=center|11
|align=center|8
|align=center|19
|align=center|40
|align=center|66
|align=center|30
|align=center|
|align=center|
|align=center|
|align=center|won the 29th place game
|-
|align=center rowspan=2|1964
|align=center|3rd "Group 2"
|align=center|11
|align=center|30
|align=center|9
|align=center|8
|align=center|13
|align=center|32
|align=center|46
|align=center|26
|align=center|
|align=center|
|align=center|
|align=center|
|-
|align=center|Finals
|align=center|28 (4)
|align=center|10
|align=center|4
|align=center|2
|align=center|4
|align=center|14
|align=center|15
|align=center|10
|align=center|
|align=center|
|align=center|
|align=center|the 25th place tournament
|-
|align=center colspan=14|Bukovina Chernovtsy / Bukovyna Chernivtsi
|-
|align=center rowspan=2|1965
|align=center|3rd "Group 2"
|align=center|7
|align=center|30
|align=center|11
|align=center|8
|align=center|11
|align=center|33
|align=center|42
|align=center|30
|align=center|
|align=center|
|align=center|
|align=center|
|-
|align=center|Finals
|align=center|20 (2)
|align=center|10
|align=center|5
|align=center|1
|align=center|4
|align=center|15
|align=center|8
|align=center|11
|align=center|
|align=center|
|align=center|
|align=center|the 19th place tournament
|-
|align=center|1966
|align=center|3rd "Group 2"
|align=center|10
|align=center|38
|align=center|12
|align=center|14
|align=center|12
|align=center|45
|align=center|48
|align=center|38
|align=center|
|align=center|
|align=center|
|align=center|won the 19th place game
|-
|align=center|1967
|align=center|3rd "Group 1"
|align=center|14
|align=center|40
|align=center|11
|align=center|12
|align=center|17
|align=center|44
|align=center|53
|align=center|34
|align=center|
|align=center|
|align=center|
|align=center|
|-
|align=center rowspan=2|1968
|align=center|3rd "Group 1"
|align=center bgcolor=silver|2
|align=center|42
|align=center|25
|align=center|10
|align=center|7
|align=center|66
|align=center|26
|align=center|60
|align=center|
|align=center|
|align=center|
|align=center|qualified for finals
|-
|align=center|Finals
|align=center bgcolor=silver|2
|align=center|7
|align=center|4
|align=center|3
|align=center|0
|align=center|11
|align=center|4
|align=center|11
|align=center|
|align=center|
|align=center|
|align=center bgcolor=lightgreen|Promoted
|-
|align=center|1969
|align=center|2nd "Group 3"
|align=center|9
|align=center|42
|align=center|16
|align=center|12
|align=center|14
|align=center|32
|align=center|33
|align=center|44
|align=center|
|align=center|
|align=center|
|align=center bgcolor=pink|Relegated
|-
|align=center|1970
|align=center|3rd "Zone 1"
|align=center|8
|align=center|42
|align=center|17
|align=center|12
|align=center|13
|align=center|45
|align=center|39
|align=center|46
|align=center|
|align=center|
|align=center|
|align=center|
|-
|align=center|1971
|align=center|3rd "Zone 1"
|align=center|16
|align=center|50
|align=center|17
|align=center|14
|align=center|19
|align=center|35
|align=center|38
|align=center|48
|align=center|
|align=center|
|align=center|
|align=center|
|-
|align=center|1972
|align=center|3rd "Zone 1"
|align=center|21
|align=center|46
|align=center|10
|align=center|16
|align=center|20
|align=center|32
|align=center|62
|align=center|36
|align=center|
|align=center|UC
|align=center| finals
|align=center|
|-
|align=center|1973
|align=center|3rd "Zone 1"
|align=center|14
|align=center|44
|align=center|14
|align=center|7/5
|align=center|18
|align=center|44
|align=center|52
|align=center|35
|align=center|
|align=center|UC
|align=center| finals
|align=center|
|-
|align=center|1974
|align=center|3rd "Zone 6"
|align=center|12
|align=center|38
|align=center|14
|align=center|10
|align=center|14
|align=center|51
|align=center|45
|align=center|38
|align=center|
|align=center|UC
|align=center| finals
|align=center|
|-
|align=center|1975
|align=center|3rd "Zone 6"
|align=center|10
|align=center|32
|align=center|10
|align=center|12
|align=center|10
|align=center|34
|align=center|38
|align=center|32
|align=center|
|align=center|UC
|align=center| finals
|align=center|
|-
|align=center|1976
|align=center|3rd "Zone 6"
|align=center|14
|align=center|38
|align=center|11
|align=center|12
|align=center|15
|align=center|29
|align=center|34
|align=center|34
|align=center|
|align=center|UC
|align=center| finals
|align=center|
|-
|align=center|1977
|align=center|3rd "Zone 2"
|align=center|9
|align=center|44
|align=center|19
|align=center|11
|align=center|14
|align=center|46
|align=center|29
|align=center|49
|align=center|
|align=center|
|align=center|
|align=center|
|-
|align=center|1978
|align=center|3rd "Zone 2"
|align=center|5
|align=center|44
|align=center|23
|align=center|11
|align=center|10
|align=center|55
|align=center|25
|align=center|57
|align=center|
|align=center|
|align=center|
|align=center|
|-
|align=center|1979
|align=center|3rd "Zone 2"
|align=center|5
|align=center|46
|align=center|24
|align=center|10
|align=center|12
|align=center|55
|align=center|32
|align=center|58
|align=center|
|align=center|
|align=center|
|align=center|
|-
|align=center|1980
|align=center|3rd "Zone 5"
|align=center bgcolor=silver|2
|align=center|44
|align=center|26
|align=center|9
|align=center|9
|align=center|70
|align=center|35
|align=center|61
|align=center|
|align=center|
|align=center|
|align=center|
|-
|align=center|1981
|align=center|3rd "Zone 5"
|align=center|4
|align=center|44
|align=center|23
|align=center|9
|align=center|12
|align=center|58
|align=center|28
|align=center|55
|align=center|
|align=center|
|align=center|
|align=center|
|-
|align=center rowspan=2|1982
|align=center|3rd "Zone 6"
|align=center bgcolor=gold|1
|align=center|46
|align=center|29
|align=center|8
|align=center|9
|align=center|71
|align=center|34
|align=center|66
|align=center|
|align=center|
|align=center|
|align=center bgcolor=gold|Champion of Ukraine
|-
|align=center|Final "Group B"
|align=center bgcolor=tan|3
|align=center|4
|align=center|1
|align=center|0
|align=center|3
|align=center|5
|align=center|10
|align=center|2
|align=center|
|align=center|
|align=center|
|align=center|promotion tournament
|-
|align=center|1983
|align=center|3rd "Zone 6"
|align=center|6
|align=center|50
|align=center|23
|align=center|14
|align=center|13
|align=center|79
|align=center|52
|align=center|60
|align=center|
|align=center|
|align=center|
|align=center|
|-
|align=center|1984
|align=center|3rd "Zone 6"
|align=center|14
|align=center|38
|align=center|15
|align=center|10
|align=center|13
|align=center|45
|align=center|36
|align=center|40
|align=center|
|align=center|
|align=center|
|align=center|two stages
|-
|align=center|1985
|align=center|3rd "Zone 6"
|align=center|9
|align=center|40
|align=center|17
|align=center|7
|align=center|16
|align=center|49
|align=center|47
|align=center|41
|align=center|
|align=center|
|align=center|
|align=center|two stages
|-
|align=center|1986
|align=center|3rd "Zone 6"
|align=center|15
|align=center|40
|align=center|14
|align=center|13
|align=center|13
|align=center|40
|align=center|38
|align=center|41
|align=center|
|align=center|
|align=center|
|align=center|two stages
|-
|align=center|1987
|align=center|3rd "Zone 6"
|align=center|4
|align=center|52
|align=center|27
|align=center|13
|align=center|12
|align=center|81
|align=center|46
|align=center|67
|align=center|
|align=center|
|align=center|
|align=center|
|-
|align=center rowspan=2|1988
|align=center|3rd "Zone 6"
|align=center bgcolor=gold|1
|align=center|50
|align=center|27
|align=center|16
|align=center|7
|align=center|85
|align=center|31
|align=center|70
|align=center rowspan=2|
|align=center|
|align=center|
|align=center bgcolor=gold|Champion of Ukraine
|-
|align=center|Final "Group 3"
|align=center bgcolor=silver|2
|align=center|4
|align=center|3
|align=center|0
|align=center|1
|align=center|6
|align=center|4
|align=center|6
|align=center|
|align=center|
|align=center|promotion tournament
|-
|align=center|1989
|align=center|3rd "Zone 6"
|align=center bgcolor=silver|2
|align=center|52
|align=center|29
|align=center|18
|align=center|5
|align=center|71
|align=center|26
|align=center|76
|align=center| finals
|align=center|
|align=center|
|align=center|
|-
|align=center|1990
|align=center|3rd "West"
|align=center bgcolor=gold|1
|align=center|50
|align=center|29
|align=center|17
|align=center|4
|align=center|87
|align=center|34
|align=center|75
|align=center| finals
|align=center|
|align=center|
|align=center bgcolor=lightgreen|Promoted
|-
|align=center|1991
|align=center|2nd
|align=center|5
|align=center|42
|align=center|20
|align=center|8
|align=center|14
|align=center|56
|align=center|49
|align=center|48
|align=center| finals
|align=center|
|align=center|
|align=center|
|-
|align=center|1992
|align=center colspan=9|No competition
|align=center| finals
|align=center|
|align=center|
|align=center|
|-
|}

Ukraine
{|class="wikitable"
|- style="background:#efefef;"
! Season
! Div.
! Pos.
! Pl.
! W
! D
! L
! GS
! GA
! P
!Domestic Cup
!colspan=2|Europe
!Notes
|-
|align=center|1992
|align=center|1st "B"
|align=center|6
|align=center|18
|align=center|7
|align=center|4
|align=center|7
|align=center|17
|align=center|16
|align=center|18
|align=center| finals
|align=center|
|align=center|
|align=center|
|-
|align=center|1992–93
|align=center|1st
|align=center|12
|align=center|39
|align=center|9
|align=center|8
|align=center|13
|align=center|27
|align=center|32
|align=center|26
|align=center| finals
|align=center|
|align=center|
|align=center|
|-
|align=center|1993–94
|align=center|1st
|align=center|17
|align=center|34
|align=center|7
|align=center|6
|align=center|21
|align=center|25
|align=center|51
|align=center|20
|align=center| finals
|align=center|
|align=center|
|  style="text-align:center; background:pink;"|Relegated
|- style="background:LightCyan;"
|align=center|1994–95
|align=center|2nd
|align=center|15
|align=center|42
|align=center|16
|align=center|5
|align=center|21
|align=center|43
|align=center|45
|align=center|53
|align=center| finals
|align=center|
|align=center|
|align=center|
|- style="background:LightCyan;"
|align=center|1995–96
|align=center|2nd
|  style="text-align:center; background:silver;"|2
|align=center|42
|align=center|30
|align=center|5
|align=center|7
|align=center|83
|align=center|34
|align=center|95
|align=center| finals
|align=center|
|align=center|
|align=center|
|- style="background:LightCyan;"
|align=center|1996–97
|align=center|2nd
|align=center|9
|align=center|46
|align=center|19
|align=center|10
|align=center|17
|align=center|64
|align=center|51
|align=center|67
|align=center| finals
|align=center|
|align=center|
|align=center|
|- style="background:LightCyan;"
|align=center|1997–98
|align=center|2nd
|align=center|18
|align=center|42
|align=center|14
|align=center|11
|align=center|17
|align=center|36
|align=center|50
|align=center|53
|align=center| finals
|align=center|
|align=center|
|align=center|
|- style="background:LightCyan;"
|align=center|1998–99
|align=center|2nd
|align=center|18
|align=center|38
|align=center|6
|align=center|9
|align=center|23
|align=center|26
|align=center|68
|align=center|27
|align=center| finals
|align=center|
|align=center|
|  style="text-align:center; background:pink;"|Relegated
|- style="background:PowderBlue;"
|align=center|1999–00
|align=center|3rd "A"
|  style="text-align:center; background:gold;"|1
|align=center|30
|align=center|22
|align=center|7
|align=center|1
|align=center|65
|align=center|13
|align=center|73
|align=center| finals Second League Cup
|align=center|
|align=center|
|  style="text-align:center; background:lightgreen;"|Promoted
|- style="background:LightCyan;"
|align=center|2000–01
|align=center|2nd
|align=center|18
|align=center|34
|align=center|6
|align=center|8
|align=center|20
|align=center|18
|align=center|41
|align=center|26
|align=center| finals
|align=center|
|align=center|
|  style="text-align:center; background:pink;"|Relegated
|- style="background:PowderBlue;"
|align=center|2001–02
|align=center|3rd "A"
|align=center|7
|align=center|36
|align=center|17
|align=center|8
|align=center|11
|align=center|40
|align=center|41
|align=center|59
|align=center|2nd round
|align=center|
|align=center|
|align=center|
|- style="background:PowderBlue;"
|align=center|2002–03
|align=center|3rd "A"
|align=center|13
|align=center|28
|align=center|6
|align=center|6
|align=center|16
|align=center|20
|align=center|39
|align=center|35
|align=center| finals
|align=center|
|align=center|
|align=center|
|- style="background:PowderBlue;"
|align=center|2003–04
|align=center|3rd "A"
|align=center|12
|align=center|30
|align=center|8
|align=center|9
|align=center|13
|align=center|23
|align=center|36
|align=center|33
|align=center| finals
|align=center|
|align=center|
|align=center|
|- style="background:PowderBlue;"
|align=center|2004–05
|align=center|3rd "A"
|align=center|6
|align=center|28
|align=center|14
|align=center|6
|align=center|8
|align=center|33
|align=center|22
|align=center|48
|align=center| finals
|align=center|
|align=center|
|align=center|
|- style="background:PowderBlue;"
|align=center|2005–06
|align=center|3rd "A"
|align=center|6
|align=center|28
|align=center|13
|align=center|5
|align=center|10
|align=center|38
|align=center|33
|align=center|44
|align=center| finals
|align=center|
|align=center|
|align=center|
|- style="background:PowderBlue;"
|align=center|2006–07
|align=center|3rd "A"
|align=center|10
|align=center|28
|align=center|5
|align=center|12
|align=center|11
|align=center|22
|align=center|40
|align=center|27
|align=center| finals
|align=center|
|align=center|
|align=center|
|- style="background:PowderBlue;"
|align=center|2007–08
|align=center|3rd "A"
|align=center|4
|align=center|30
|align=center|17
|align=center|6
|align=center|7
|align=center|43
|align=center|23
|align=center|57
|align=center|did not enter
|align=center|
|align=center|
|align=center|
|- style="background:PowderBlue;"
|align=center|2008–09
|align=center|3rd "A"
|align=center|9
|align=center|32
|align=center|14
|align=center|2
|align=center|16
|align=center|29
|align=center|39
|align=center|44
|align=center| finals
|align=center|
|align=center|
|align=center|
|- style="background:PowderBlue;"
|align=center|2009–10
|align=center|3rd "A"
|  style="text-align:center; background:gold;"|1
|align=center|20
|align=center|15
|align=center|3
|align=center|2
|align=center|35
|align=center|12
|align=center|48
|align=center| finals
|align=center|
|align=center|
|  style="text-align:center; background:lightgreen;"|Promoted
|- style="background:LightCyan;"
|align=center|2010–11
|align=center|2nd
|align=center|7
|align=center|34
|align=center|17
|align=center|5
|align=center|12
|align=center|48
|align=center|45
|align=center|56
|align=center| finals
|align=center|
|align=center|
|align=center|
|- style="background:LightCyan;"
|align=center|2011–12
|align=center|2nd
|align=center|6
|align=center|34
|align=center|15
|align=center|12
|align=center|7
|align=center|38
|align=center|29
|align=center|57
|align=center| finals
|align=center|
|align=center|
|align=center|	
|- style="background:LightCyan;"
|align=center|2012–13
|align=center|2nd
|align=center|4
|align=center|34 	
|align=center|16 	
|align=center|10 	
|align=center|8 	
|align=center|49 	
|align=center|33 	
|align=center|58
|align=center| finals
|align=center|
|align=center|
|align=center|
|- style="background:LightCyan;"
|align=center|2013–14
|align=center|2nd
|align=center|12
|align=center|30
|align=center|10
|align=center| 6
|align=center|14
|align=center|26
|align=center|36
|align=center|36
|align=center| finals
|align=center|
|align=center|
|align=center|
|- style="background:LightCyan;"
|align=center|2014–15
|align=center|2nd
|align=center|16
|align=center|30
|align=center|4
|align=center|3
|align=center|23
|align=center|24
|align=center|61
|align=center|15
|align=center| finals
|align=center|
|align=center|
|  style="text-align:center; background:pink;"|Relegated
|- style="background:PowderBlue;"
|align=center|2015–16
|align=center|3rd
|align=center|4
|align=center|26 	
|align=center|13 	
|align=center|8 	
|align=center|5 	
|align=center|39 	
|align=center|22 	
|align=center|47
|align=center| finals
|align=center|
|align=center|
|  style="text-align:center; background:lightgreen;"|Promoted 
|- style="background:LightCyan;"
|align=center|2016–17
|align=center|2nd
|align=center|16
|align=center|34 	
|align=center|8 	
|align=center|9 	
|align=center|17 	
|align=center|27 	
|align=center|40 	
|align=center|33
|align=center| finals
|align=center|
|align=center|
|  style="text-align:center; background:pink;"|Relegated
|- style="background:PowderBlue;"
|align=center|2017–18
|align=center|3rd
|align=center|6
|align=center|27  
|align=center|9  
|align=center|	7 	
|align=center|11  	 	
|align=center|32 	 	
|align=center|	40  	
|align=center|34
|align=center| finals
|align=center|
|align=center|
|align=center|
|- style="background:PowderBlue;"
| style="text-align:center;"|2018–19
| style="text-align:center;"|3rd
| style="text-align:center;"|10/10
| style="text-align:center;"|27
| style="text-align:center;"|5
| style="text-align:center;"|6
| style="text-align:center;"|16
| style="text-align:center;"|19
| style="text-align:center;"|43 
| style="text-align:center;"|21
| style="text-align:center;"| finals
| style="text-align:center;"|
| style="text-align:center;"|
| style="text-align:center;"|Avoided relegation
|- style="background:PowderBlue;"
| style="text-align:center;"|2019–20
| style="text-align:center;"|3rd
| style="text-align:center;"|8/11
| style="text-align:center;"|20
| style="text-align:center;"|6
| style="text-align:center;"|2
| style="text-align:center;"|12
| style="text-align:center;"|25
| style="text-align:center;"|36
| style="text-align:center;"|20
| style="text-align:center;"| finals
| style="text-align:center;"|
| style="text-align:center;"|
| style="text-align:center;"|
|}

Presidents
 1993 – 1998 Vasyl Fedoriuk
 2007 – 2010 Vasyl Fedoriuk
 2019 – present Vadym Zayats

FC Bukovyna-2 Chernivtsi

{|class="wikitable"
|- style="background:#efefef;"
! Season
! Div.
! Pos.
! Pl.
! W
! D
! L
! GS
! GA
! P
!Domestic Cup
!colspan=2|Europe
!Notes
|- style="background:BlueSteel;"
|align=center|2013
|align=center|4th(Amatory)
|align=center|6
|align=center|10
|align=center|2
|align=center|1
|align=center|7
|align=center|7
|align=center|15
|align=center|7
|align=center|
|align=center|
|align=center|
|align=center|
|}

References

External links
 

 
Ukrainian First League clubs
Sport in Chernivtsi
Association football clubs established in 1958
1958 establishments in Ukraine
Football clubs in the Ukrainian Soviet Socialist Republic
Football clubs in Chernivtsi Oblast